The Air Creation NuviX is a French double-surface ultralight trike wing, designed and produced by Air Creation of Aubenas. The wing is widely used on Air Creation trikes.

Design and development
The wing is a cable-braced, king post-equipped hang glider-style wing that was designed as an advanced, top-of-the-line wing for the Air Creation Skypper two-place trike, although it can also be fitted on the earlier Air Creation GT series of trikes as well.

The wing is made from bolted-together aluminum tubing, with its double surface wing covered in Dacron sailcloth. It has a span of  span wing, a nose angle of 130°, an aspect ratio of 6.0:1 and uses an "A" frame weight-shift control bar. Like the similar Air Creation BioniX wing, the NuviX incorporates a unique "corset" system that allows the pilot to adjust the wing's trailing edge geometry in flight to optimize performance. This results in a large speed range and good handling characteristics in turbulence, without heavy roll control.

Applications
Air Creation GT
Air Creation Skypper

Specifications (NuviX 15)

References

External links

Ultralight trike wings